Jumping in the Sugar Bowl is the fourth album by American pianist Amina Claudine Myers featuring performances recorded in 1984 for the Minor Music label.

Reception
The Allmusic review by Ron Wynn awarded the album 4 stars stating "Intense, provocative mixture of outside and inside sensibilities. Myers at times ranges and attacks the keyboard, then will change direction and display a soulful, gospel-influenced style. The constantly shifting session keeps things interesting, and there are some fine solos as well".

Track listing
All compositions by Amina Claudine Myers except as indicated
 "Jumping in the Sugar Bowl" - 8:31
 "Another Day" (Catherine Bowne, Amina Claudine Myers) - 6:03
 "Cecil B" - 9:24
 "Guten Morgen" - 9:46
 "Mind Chambers" - 6:10
 "Cameloupe" - 7:50
Recorded at Tonstudio Bauer in Ludwigsburg, Germany in March 1984

Personnel
Amina Claudine Myers - piano, organ, voice
Thomas Palmer - bass, electric bass
Reggie Nicholson - percussion, voice

References

Amina Claudine Myers albums
1984 albums